The Men's 1 km time trial competition at the 2019 UCI Track Cycling World Championships was held on 1 March 2019.

Results

Qualifying
The qualifying was started at 15:18. The top 8 riders qualified for the final.

Final
The final was started at 19:56.

References

Men's 1 km time trial
2019